Rio Township is one of twenty-one townships in Knox County, Illinois, USA.  As of the 2010 census, its population was 518 and it contained 235 housing units.

Geography

Cities, towns, villages
 Rio

Cemeteries
The township contains these four cemeteries: Bruner, Deatherage, Rio Baptist and Rio.

Airports and landing strips
 Johnson Landing Strip

Demographics

School districts
 Rowva Community Unit School District 208
 United Community School District 304

Political districts
 Illinois's 17th congressional district
 State House District 74
 State Senate District 37

References
 
 United States Census Bureau 2009 TIGER/Line Shapefiles
 United States National Atlas

External links
 City-Data.com
 Illinois State Archives
 Township Officials of Illinois

Townships in Knox County, Illinois
Galesburg, Illinois micropolitan area
Townships in Illinois